Seis peniques (Six pennies) is the debut album by English singer and songwriter Sofia Ellar. It was released 24 February 2017. The record is a collection of pop and folk she wrote during several years, with themes inspired from her past experiences. The name of the album pays tribute to a former pub in Madrid, Spain.

Track listing

References

2017 debut albums
Sofia Ellar albums